List of wars involving Serbia in the Middle Ages

See also

Medieval Serbian army
List of wars involving Serbia

References

Military history of Serbia in the Middle Ages
Serbian military-related lists
Serbia history-related lists